The 37th Australian Film Institute Awards (generally known as the AFI Awards) were held on 10 November 1995 in Melbourne. Presented by the Australian Film Institute (AFI), the awards celebrated the best in Australian feature film, documentary, short film and television productions of 1995. The ceremony was broadcast live on ABC and hosted by comedian Magda Szubanski. The nominations were announced on 9 August 1995. Hotel Sorrento received the most nominations in the feature film category with ten, while Halifax f.p. received fifteen nominations in the television category.

Winners and nominees
Winners are listed first and highlighted in boldface.

Feature film

Non-feature film

Television

Additional awards

References

External links
 The Australian Film Institute | Australian Academy of Cinema and Television Arts official website

AACTA Awards ceremonies
AACTA Awards
AACTA Awards
AACTA Awards
AACTA Awards